The Nollywood and African Film Critics Awards is an annual award that rewards film practitioners in the African continent. It has been held in the United States since its maiden edition on September 17, 2011. 

The 4th edition was held on 13 September 2014 at Saban Theatre, Beverly Hills, California.

The 2016 ceremony was held on November 19 at Alex Theatre, Glendale, California. Stephanie Okereke, Mike Ezuruonye and Obi Emelonye were among the winners.

Categories
As at 2014, the following were the categories:

Best Actor in a Leading Role
Best Actress in a Leading Role
Best Actor in a Supporting Role
Best Actress in a Supporting Role
Best Promising Actor in a Film
Best Actress Foreign Film
Best Child Actor in a Film
Best Director
Best Film
Best Comedy
Best Drama
Best Sound
Best Visual Effects
Best Cinematography
Best Editing
Best Original Score
Best Makeup
Best Costume
Best Indigenous Film
Best Foreign Film
Best Short Film/Trailer
Best TV/Talk Show/Online Series

 Diaspora Categories
Best Diaspora Film
Best Diaspora Drama
Best Actor in a Leading Role in a Diaspora Film
Best Actress in a Leading Role in a Diaspora Film
Best Actor in a Supporting Role in a Diaspora Film
Best Actress in a Supporting Role in a Diaspora Film
Best Director
Best Director Foreign Film
Best Actor Foreign Film

 People's Choice Categories
Favorite Actor
Favorite Actress
Favorite Director
Favorite Screenwriter
Favorite Original Score
Favorite Short Film/Trailer
Best Promising Actor
Artiste of the Year
Song of the Year
Best Docudrama

References

External links
Official Website

Awards established in 2011
Nigerian film awards